WNRG is a Southern Gospel-formatted broadcast radio station licensed to Grundy, Virginia, serving Grundy and Buchanan County, Virginia. WNRG is owned and operated by Peggy Sue Broadcasting Corporation.

References

External links

NRG
Radio stations established in 1955
1955 establishments in Virginia
Southern Gospel radio stations in the United States